The Monitor Action Group is a political party in Namibia. The party came into existence as the transformation of the National Party of South West Africa in 1991, Kosie Pretorius became its first chairperson and served until his retirement from active politics in June 2013. The party is based among conservative Afrikaners, with most of the top leadership having served in the government of apartheid South West Africa. In June 2009, the party contended that aspects of the affirmative action policy of Namibia violated the country's constitution.

Electoral history 

At the parliamentary elections 15 and 16 November 2004, the party won 0.8% of popular votes and 1 out of 72 seats. The party was run by Kosie Pretorius, though Jurie Viljoen was the party's representative in the National Assembly.

In the 2009 election, the party chose not to run a candidate for president, but competed for seats in the National Assembly of Namibia. However, the party received only 4,718 votes, just below the minimum for a seat in the National Assembly. Ahead of the election, the top four party leaders were Kosie Pretorius, Jurie Viljoen, Gernot Wilfrid Schaaf and Eric Peters.

The party's election results further deteriorated in 2014. It did not contest the 2019 Namibian general election. In the 2020 local authority election it narrowly gained a seat in the Outjo municipality.

Presidential elections

National Assembly elections

References 

 
Afrikaner organizations
Political parties in Namibia
Conservative parties in Namibia
Political parties of minorities
Political parties established in 1991
Protestant political parties
White Namibian people